South Carolina wine refers to wine made from grapes grown in the U.S. state of South Carolina.  The climate of South Carolina is challenging for the production of wine grapes.  Hot and humid summers require viticulturists to adapt their canopy management to minimize direct sunlight on the grapes, which are often harvested early in the summer.  There are twelve wineries in South Carolina and no designated American Viticulture Areas.

References

Wine regions of the United States by state
Tourism in South Carolina
Agriculture in South Carolina